The Jersey Jays were a professional American football team based in Jersey City, New Jersey. They began play in 1969 as a member of the Continental Football League, and were a farm team of the NFL's Cleveland Browns. The Jays played their home games in Newark Schools Stadium in 1969.

The Jays were the second team in the COFL to play in Newark. The Newark Bears were a charter member of the league when it debuted in 1965 before it relocated to become the Orlando Panthers in 1966. The Jays were established to take the place of the Charleston Rockets, who left the league following the 1968 season.

The Jays moved to the Atlantic Coast Football League in the 1969-70 offseason, just before the COFL folded. That season the team also moved to nearby Roosevelt Stadium in Jersey City. The Jays ceased operations after one year in the ACFL, and their players were distributed as part of a dispersal draft in May 1971.

Season-by-season

References

Continental Football League teams
Atlantic Coast Football League teams
Defunct American football teams in New Jersey
Jersey City, New Jersey
American football teams established in 1965
American football teams disestablished in 1971
1965 establishments in New Jersey
1971 disestablishments in New Jersey